Zainab is an Arabic surname. Notable people with the surname include:

 Ali ibn Zainab, seventh century sahaba of Muhammad
 Tengku Zainab (1917–1993), Malaysian Raja
 Umamah bint Zainab, seventh century granddaughter of Muhammad

Arabic-language surnames